Amil High School for Girls is a high school in Kadhimiyah, Baghdad, Iraq. In February 2007 the school had over 1,000 students. The school admitted 135 new students in a period from November 2006 to February 2007.

References

Girls' schools in Iraq
Schools in Baghdad